Charles David Liddell (born December 17, 1969) is an American, retired mixed martial artist (MMA) who held the title of UFC Light Heavyweight Champion. He is widely credited, along with fellow UFC fighter, Randy Couture, with helping bring MMA into the mainstream of American sports and entertainment. Known as "The Iceman," Liddell compiled a 16-6 UFC record and an overall record 21-8, with 16 of his wins coming by way of knockout, before retiring in late 2010. (He came out of retirement for one match in 2018, a loss, bringing his career record to 21-9.) On July 10, 2009, Liddell was inducted into the UFC Hall of Fame.

Early life
Born in Santa Barbara, California, Liddell was raised by his single mother and maternal grandfather, who taught Liddell and his siblings Boxing techniques from a very young age. Liddell began studying Karate at the age of 12; the tattoo on his scalp reads "Koei-Kan" (幸栄館). 

While growing up in Santa Barbara, he often frequented the Del Playa Drive, a street popular for parties in the UCSB college town of Isla Vista. As Liddell wrote in his book Iceman: My Fighting Life, he often found himself in fights with drunk college students older than he. 

In high school, Liddell was a four-year starter on the football team at San Marcos High School, playing center and Linebacker, and he also excelled at Wrestling. In college, he wrestled at Cal Poly, where he attended from 1988-93, and graduated with a bachelor's degree in business/accounting in 1995. Liddell was inducted into the Cal Poly Hall of Fame in 2009.

Mixed martial arts career

UFC

Early success
Liddell made his UFC debut in 1998 during UFC 17 in Mobile, Alabama with a decision victory over Noe Hernandez. In his next bout, he faced Brazilian fighter Jose "Pele" Landi-Johns at an International Vale Tudo Championship event in Sao Paulo, Brazil, which was bare-knuckle. Despite being a heavy underdog in his opponent's home country, Liddell dominated the vale tudo fighter on the feet, and won via decision. After a technical submission loss to top contender Jeremy Horn shortly after, Liddell began establishing his reputation as a top contender with dominant victories over Kevin Randleman, Murilo Bustamante, Vitor Belfort, Amar Suloev, Jeff Monson, and Renato Sobral. Liddell was also the first UFC fighter to fight in Pride, where he represented the organization against fellow kickboxer Guy Mezger, knocking him unconscious.

Liddell vs. Couture

By 2002, Liddell was considered the #1 contender for the UFC Light Heavyweight Championship, with growing popularity and support from his fans. The UFC tried to arrange a title bout with then-champion Tito Ortiz, but Ortiz cited scheduling conflicts.

To force Ortiz's hand, they created an interim light heavyweight championship and matched Liddell with Greco-Roman wrestler and former heavyweight champion "The Natural" Randy Couture at UFC 43. Couture neutralized Liddell's hooks with straight punches and eventually began taking "The Iceman" down at will. Couture eventually gained full mount and forced a referee stoppage due to a barrage of punches.

Pride Grand Prix Tournament against Overeem/Jackson
After his defeat to Couture, Liddell entered the Pride 2003 Middleweight Grand Prix tournament as the official UFC representative. Liddell defeated Muay Thai specialist Alistair Overeem in the first round of the tournament. In the action-packed bout, Liddell was getting out-landed by the taller, quicker and more technical striking of Overeem; later in the round Liddell landed an overhand punch to the head of Overeem, sending him staggering into the ropes. Liddell then rushed in with knees and straight rights and knocked Overeem out at the end of the first round.

In the next round, Liddell was eliminated by fan-favorite Quinton "Rampage" Jackson. In the first round of his fight with Jackson, Liddell landed shots as he found his distance but Jackson countered with powerful strikes, rocking Liddell numerous times. In the second round, Jackson continued to out-land Liddell with big punches, but could not finish him. Later in the second round a visibly exhausted Liddell was taken down and received a barrage of punches from the ground. His corner threw in the towel, giving Jackson the upset victory.

Liddell vs. Ortiz

Returning to the UFC, Liddell was once again in contention for the light heavyweight title, preparing for a match with former champion Tito Ortiz. Eventually, after Ortiz lost the title to Randy Couture, the two would meet in a highly anticipated bout at UFC 47 on April 2, 2004, in Las Vegas, Nevada. After most of the first round was spent feeling each other out, Liddell threw a few punches and a kick which was blocked by Ortiz, with Ortiz slapping himself on the head, taunting Liddell.

When the round ended Ortiz pushed referee "Big" John McCarthy out of his way, into Liddell, and the pair exchanged words. Shortly after the second round started, Liddell landed a flurry of punches that dropped Ortiz and led to a TKO victory. Ortiz has since stated that Liddell's thumb made contact with his eye, causing him momentarily to see "nothing but black". Since UFC 47, the bad blood between both fighters remained, with Ortiz repeatedly stating that he wanted "his" title belt back. Despite the tension, Ortiz and Liddell would not fight again for two and a half years.

Continued success

The Ultimate Fighter
In early 2005, Liddell was a coach on the inaugural season of The Ultimate Fighter, Spike TV's reality show which featured fighters competing for a UFC contract.

He coached Team Liddell, while then UFC Light Heavyweight Champion Randy Couture coached Team Couture. The series was a success for both Spike TV and the UFC. Both of the winners of the show, Diego Sanchez and Forrest Griffin, were members of Team Liddell and went on to have very successful careers in the UFC.

Liddell vs. Couture II
On April 16, 2005, at UFC 52, Liddell fought Randy Couture, again for the light heavyweight title. Couture moved in for a punch, Liddell countered with a big right hand to the temple of Couture, knocking him out cold, making him the new UFC Light Heavyweight Champion.

Liddell vs. Horn II
Liddell was scheduled to defend his new title against longtime veteran Jeremy Horn, at UFC 54, a matchup the UFC claimed was demanded by long-time fans of the sport since Horn had given Liddell his first loss. Throughout the bout, Liddell dominated with aggressive punches, causing knockdowns in several rounds. Liddell's defensive wrestling ability, especially his sprawl, stifled the bulk of Horn's offense, which was centered on grappling and submission wrestling.

Liddell eventually won the fight via TKO in 2:46 minutes of the fourth round after Horn informed the referee that he could not see. He had been hit with a right punch to the eye causing him to bleed from his eye as well as his nose. Liddell had successfully defended his title and, in the process, avenged two of his three career losses.

Liddell vs. Couture III
On February 4, 2006, at UFC 57, Liddell faced Randy Couture in a rubber match, After an action packed first round, Liddell landed a big punch to Couture's face causing him to bleed, Couture bounced back with a take down of Liddell, but he was able to get up right away. Later in the second round as Couture moved in Liddell countered similar to in the second fight at UFC 52 knocking Couture out, defeating Couture for the second time via knockout in Las Vegas, Nevada, to retain the light heavyweight championship belt. After the fight, Couture announced his retirement from mixed martial arts.

Liddell vs. Sobral II
In his next defense, at UFC 62 on August 26, 2006, Liddell would beat Renato "Babalu" Sobral, who he had defeated nearly three years prior. Seconds after the fight started Sobral came running forward throwing punches. Liddell, moving backwards, was landing big punches, and a right uppercut ended the fight at 1:35 of the first round. It was announced during UFC 61 that, were he to defeat Sobral, Liddell would face off against PRIDE Middleweight Champion Wanderlei Silva. The fight failed to materialize due to the competing promotions' inability to reach an agreement. UFC president Dana White attributed this to Silva's subsequent knockout loss to Mirko Filipović.

Liddell vs. Ortiz II
In what was the most financially successful UFC event up to that point, Liddell fought a rematch with Tito Ortiz at UFC 66, which took place on December 30, 2006. Liddell's takedown defense neutralized Ortiz's wrestling ability, forcing Ortiz to stand up with a known striker. Although Ortiz did take Liddell down at one point in the fight, Liddell went on to defeat Ortiz via TKO in the third round to defend his light heavyweight championship successfully for a fourth time. It was later revealed that Liddell had torn his MCL prior to the fight. He had also popped the tendon out on the middle finger on his left hand during the fight itself.

Title loss and decline

Liddell vs. Jackson II
In his fifth defense, Liddell would lose the title at UFC 71 on May 26, 2007, in a rematch with Quinton "Rampage" Jackson. Liddell was knocked down by a right hook less than two minutes into the first round and was unable to defend himself against Jackson's strikes on the ground, resulting in a knockout victory for Jackson. After the loss, Liddell was widely criticized after reports indicated he had been seen in night clubs the week before the event. He responded that it was not anything he had not done prior to his other fights in Las Vegas.

Liddell vs. Jardine

On July 11, 2007, Dana White confirmed in an interview with Yahoo! Sports that a rumored bout between Wanderlei Silva and Liddell had been canceled indefinitely. Silva and Liddell were supposed to fight in the main event at UFC 76 in Anaheim, California. Instead, Liddell would face Keith Jardine.

In the main event of UFC 76, Liddell came out landing his signature right hand to the head of Jardine, rocking him backwards, but Jardine stayed in the fight. After a dominant first round for Liddell, Jardine started to land low leg kicks continuously, while Liddell was unable to time his strikes against the unorthodox southpaw. Liddell lost a close split decision, making it the first time he had suffered consecutive losses in his career. Liddell stated he wanted a rematch and claimed he had never taken Jardine seriously.

Liddell vs. Silva
On October 23, 2007, White announced that a matchup between Liddell and Wanderlei Silva would finally take place at UFC 79. Liddell defeated Silva via unanimous decision, out-landing Silva with harder, more efficient punches and getting two takedowns later in the fight. Both fighters were awarded "Fight of the Night" honors. This fight was voted 2007's Fight of the Year at the first annual World Mixed Martial Arts Awards and ultimately was Liddell's final victory in MMA.

Liddell vs. Evans
On February 1, 2008, Maurício "Shogun" Rua revealed that he had recently signed a contract to fight Liddell, however on March 4 it was announced on UFC.com that Rua was receiving surgery on his knee and had been forced to withdraw from the fight. It was later officially announced that undefeated wrestler "Suga" Rashad Evans would replace Maurício Rua in a bout at UFC 85 in London, England. However, a hamstring injury forced Liddell to withdraw from the fight.

On September 6, 2008, Liddell faced Rashad Evans at UFC 88. He lost the fight via knockout in the second round after Evans connected with an overhand right. The loss led to renewed criticism of Liddell over-relying on the same coaches and training partners.

Shortly after his knockout loss to Evans, long-time trainer John Hackleman confirmed that Liddell was participating in training sessions with American Top Team to "round out his skills", although he remained officially associated with Hackleman and The Pit fight team.

Liddell vs. Shogun
On January 17, 2009, Dana White confirmed during the UFC 93 post fight press conference that Liddell's next fight would be against the 2005 Pride Middleweight Grand Prix Champion Maurício "Shogun" Rua at UFC 97 on April 18 in Montréal, Canada.

Liddell was defeated by Rua due to punches late in the first round resulting in a technical knockout. After the fight, White declared that Liddell would retire from fighting.

White stated, "I care about him. I care about his health, and it's over, man. It's over." White went further, saying, "At the end of the day, I care about these guys. I don't want to see anybody stick around too long. You're never going to see Chuck Liddell on the canvas again." In May however, Liddell's trainer, John Hackleman, claimed 'with confidence' that Liddell isn't done yet and that he's "definitely on top of the food chain."

In a later interview, White went on to say, "Can I tell him not to fight? Absolutely not. If he still wants to fight, he can fight. I'm not saying, 'It will never happen. It will never happen.' But he made a deal with me [not to fight]."

Hall of Fame and talks of retirement
On July 10, 2009, at the UFC 100 Fan Expo in Las Vegas, Nevada, Liddell was inducted into the UFC Hall of Fame.

After UFC 101 in August, Dana White stated that "I don't want him to (fight). He wants to, so we'll see what happens." Two days later, Liddell went on record to say that he was undecided on the matter and that "it's hard for an athlete to quit what he's done his whole life." Liddell went on to say that he would be "making that decision in the gym, not in the ring" after sparring sessions.

Liddell vs. Franklin

It was later announced that Liddell would be coaching against fierce rival Tito Ortiz on the 11th season of The Ultimate Fighter, with the two of them fighting each other on June 12, 2010, at UFC 115. However, in March, it was rumored that Ortiz had pulled out for unknown reasons and would be replaced by former UFC middleweight champion Rich Franklin.  This was denied by UFC president Dana White.

On April 7, 2010, White confirmed that Liddell vs. Ortiz 3 would be the main event for the card. However, on April 12, 2010, the main event was changed to Liddell vs. Rich Franklin.

On June 12, 2010, Liddell faced Franklin at UFC 115 in Vancouver, British Columbia, Canada. Franklin connected with a counter right hook, knocking Liddell unconscious with five seconds remaining in the first round. Earlier in the fight, Franklin had broken his arm blocking a body kick from Liddell. Only a few hours after the match, UFC President Dana White declared that Chuck Liddell would not fight in the UFC ever again.

UFC retirement
With the opinions and considerations of his family and friends in mind after losing three consecutive fights by knockout, Liddell decided to end his fighting career on December 29, 2010. At the UFC 125 press conference, Liddell announced his retirement and stated he would be taking the position of Vice President of Business Development within the UFC. Liddell was visibly emotional at the announcement, acknowledging his retirement and an end to his fighting with words of farewell: "Most of all I want to thank my fans and my family. I love this sport and I'm excited to go to this new stage in my life and keep promoting the best sport in the world, the sport I love... now that I'm retired."

On September 8, 2013, during an interview on the Opie and Anthony show, Liddell stated that there was a possibility of one last comeback, similar to George Foreman.

Return and second retirement
Liddell announced on April 14, 2018, that he was coming out of retirement to target a third fight with Tito Ortiz. The fight took place on November 24, 2018 under Oscar De La Hoya's Golden Boy Promotions. Liddell lost the fight via knockout in the first round.

On March 3, 2020, Liddell announced in a TMZ interview that he has retired from mixed martial arts again.

Fighting style
Chuck Liddell was one of the first successful proponents of the "sprawl and brawl" MMA fighting style, which relied on takedown defense and standup fighting in an era where wrestling had been the dominant force. Liddell's style (a hybrid of karate and kajukenbo) focused mainly on the hands, although he was also successful at times with the head kick. To viewers, his unique striking style did not appear refined but his combination of speed, accuracy, and power meant that he was one of the most dangerous knockout artists of his time. While not the most defensively sound, for years he was known for having a granite chin and being near-impossible to knock out.

Legal trouble

2021 arrest 
On October 11, 2021, Liddell was arrested and booked into a Los Angeles-area jail on a misdemeanor charge of domestic battery. He was held at the Malibu Sheriff’s Station on a $20,000 bond. After his bond was met and Liddell was released, he posted a statement on his Instagram page stating he was the victim of domestic violence, but offered to protect his family from legal issues  and voluntarily went into custody instead of his wife. The court hearing for this case was scheduled on October 13, 2021. According to the legal report Liddell and his wife were pushing each other during an argument and Liddell had marks on his face and chest, while his wife did not have any physical marks on her after the incident. The District Attorney’s office opted not to charge against Liddell or his wife. Three days after the alleged domestic incident, Liddell filed for a divorce.

Personal life 

Liddell is associated with John Hackleman and The Pit fight team. His brother Sean, who also competed in MMA and fought in the WEC, retired in 2007 with a 1–2 record. He has a brother named Dan and a sister named Laura. 

Liddell continues to train in San Luis Obispo, California, where he attended college along with fellow team member and friend Wyatt Courtney.
He has one child with MMA fighter Casey Noland, a daughter named Trista. From a prior relationship he has a son named Cade. Liddell proposed to his girlfriend Heidi Northcott on November 4, 2010. Their daughter Guinevere was born in 2011. Their son, Charles David Liddell Jr., was born in 2013. 

Liddell is a former part-owner of two bars in Lincoln, Nebraska: Dillinger's and NZone.

In 2010, he opened The Ultimate Iceman, a memorabilia store in San Luis Obispo. This store was closed in 2011 to focus on online sales.

Liddell endorsed John McCain in the 2008 United States presidential election.

Liddell's moniker, "The Iceman", was coined by his trainer, John Hackleman, of Liddell's calm and relaxed temperament before fights.
After retirement, Liddell served as Vice President of Business Development within the UFC.

Good Morning Texas interview 
In March 2007, shortly before UFC 68, he appeared on Good Morning Texas (Texan version of Good Morning America) for an interview, and to promote the film 300, but appeared to be very drowsy and fell asleep mid-interview. The interview ended when Liddell asked the host who he would like to fight. UFC President Dana White, along with Liddell's head coach Scott VanGilder, explained that Liddell had pneumonia and had taken a large dose of sedatives the night before the interview.

Print media
On May 9, 2007, Liddell became the first UFC fighter to be on the cover of ESPN The Magazine. Liddell released his autobiography, Iceman: My Fighting Life, on January 29, 2008, and it spent multiple weeks on the New York Times' best seller list.

Filmography

Television
Liddell was one of 16 people to compete on Season 9 of Dancing with the Stars. He and professional dance partner, Anna Trebunskaya got 11th place in Week 4.

In 2009, Liddell made a guest appearance on The Simpsons in Season 21, Episode 3 The Great Wife Hope.

In 2018, Liddell was a houseguest on the first U.S. season of Celebrity Big Brother, where he was the first person evicted.

In October 2019, ESPN released the first of their 30 for 30 specials to focus on mixed martial arts. The film, called 'Chuck and Tito', focused on the fights and feud between Liddell and Tito Ortiz.

Championships and awards

Mixed martial arts 
Ultimate Fighting Championship
UFC Hall of Fame (Pioneer wing, 2009 inductee)
UFC Light Heavyweight Championship (One time)
Four successful title defenses
Fight of the Night (Two times) 
Knockout of the Night (Two times) 
Most knockouts in the UFC Light Heavyweight division history (10)
International Fighting Championship
IFC World Light Heavyweight Championship (Once)
Sherdog
2006 Fighter of the Year
Mixed Martial Arts Hall of Fame
Black Belt Magazine
2001 NHB Co-Competitor of the Year along with Tito Ortiz
World MMA Awards
2008 Fight of the Year vs. Wanderlei Silva at UFC 79
Spike TV Guys' Choice Awards
2007 Most Dangerous Man.

Kickboxing
International Kickboxing Federation
IKF Amateur International Rules U.S. Super Heavyweight Championship (One time)
World Kickboxing and Karate Association
WKA Amateur International Rules U.S. Heavyweight Championship (One time)
'United States Muay Thai Association
USMTA Amateur Muay Thai North American Heavyweight Championship (One time)

Mixed martial arts record

|-
| Loss
| align=center| 21–9
| Tito Ortiz
| KO (punches) 
| Golden Boy Promotions: Liddell vs. Ortiz 3
| 
| align=center| 1
| align=center| 4:24
| Inglewood, California, United States
| 
|-
| Loss
| align=center| 21–8
| Rich Franklin
| KO (punch)
| UFC 115
| 
| align=center| 1
| align=center| 4:55
| Vancouver, British Columbia, Canada
| 
|-
| Loss
| align=center| 21–7
| Maurício Rua
| TKO (punches)
| UFC 97
| 
| align=center| 1
| align=center| 4:28
| Montreal, Quebec, Canada
| 
|-
| Loss
| align=center| 21–6
| Rashad Evans
| KO (punch)
| UFC 88
| 
| align=center| 2
| align=center| 1:51
| Atlanta, Georgia, United States
| 
|-
| Win
| align=center| 21–5
| Wanderlei Silva
| Decision (unanimous)
| UFC 79
| 
| align=center| 3
| align=center| 5:00
| Las Vegas, Nevada, United States
| 
|-
| Loss
| align=center| 20–5
| Keith Jardine
| Decision (split)
| UFC 76
| 
| align=center| 3
| align=center| 5:00
| Anaheim, California, United States
| 
|-
| Loss
| align=center| 20–4
| Quinton Jackson
| KO (punches)
| UFC 71
| 
| align=center| 1
| align=center| 1:53
| Las Vegas, Nevada, United States
| 
|-
| Win
| align=center| 20–3
| Tito Ortiz
| TKO (punches)
| UFC 66: Liddell vs. Ortiz
| 
| align=center| 3
| align=center| 3:59
| Las Vegas, Nevada, United States
| 
|-
| Win
| align=center| 19–3
| Renato Sobral
| TKO (punches)
| UFC 62: Liddell vs. Sobral
| 
| align=center| 1
| align=center| 1:35
| Las Vegas, Nevada, United States
| 
|-
| Win
| align=center| 18–3
| Randy Couture
| KO (punch)
| UFC 57: Liddell vs. Couture 3
| 
| align=center| 2
| align=center| 1:28
| Las Vegas, Nevada, United States
| 
|-
| Win
| align=center| 17–3
| Jeremy Horn
| TKO (retirement)
| UFC 54
| 
| align=center| 4
| align=center| 2:46
| Las Vegas, Nevada, United States
| 
|-
| Win
| align=center| 16–3
| Randy Couture
| KO (punches)
| UFC 52
| 
| align=center| 1
| align=center| 2:06
| Las Vegas, Nevada, United States
| 
|-
| Win
| align=center| 15–3
| Vernon White
| KO (punch)
| UFC 49
| 
| align=center| 1
| align=center| 4:05
| Las Vegas, Nevada, United States
| 
|-
| Win
| align=center| 14–3
| Tito Ortiz
| KO (punches)
| UFC 47
| 
| align=center| 2
| align=center| 0:38
| Las Vegas, Nevada, United States
| 
|-
| Loss
| align=center| 13–3
| Quinton Jackson
| TKO (corner stoppage)
| Pride Final Conflict 2003
| 
| align=center| 2
| align=center| 3:10
| Tokyo, Japan
| 
|-
| Win
| align=center| 13–2
| Alistair Overeem
| KO (punches)
| Pride Total Elimination 2003
| 
| align=center| 1
| align=center| 3:09
| Saitama, Saitama, Japan
| 
|-
| Loss
| align=center| 12–2
| Randy Couture
| TKO (punches)
| UFC 43
| 
| align=center| 3
| align=center| 2:39
| Las Vegas, Nevada, United States
| 
|-
| Win
| align=center| 12–1
| Renato Sobral
| KO (head kick)
| UFC 40
| 
| align=center| 1
| align=center| 2:55
| Las Vegas, Nevada, United States
| 
|-
| Win
| align=center| 11–1
| Vitor Belfort
| Decision (unanimous)
| UFC 37.5
| 
| align=center| 3
| align=center| 5:00
| Las Vegas, Nevada, United States
| 
|-
| Win
| align=center| 10–1
| Amar Suloev
| Decision (unanimous)
| UFC 35
| 
| align=center| 3
| align=center| 5:00
| Uncasville, Connecticut, United States
| 
|-
| Win
| align=center| 9–1
| Murilo Bustamante
| Decision (unanimous)
| UFC 33
| 
| align=center| 3
| align=center| 5:00
| Las Vegas, Nevada, United States
| 
|-
| Win
| align=center| 8–1
| Guy Mezger
| KO (punch)
| Pride 14 - Clash of the Titans
| 
| align=center| 2
| align=center| 0:21
| Kanagawa, Japan
| 
|-
| Win
| align=center| 7–1
| Kevin Randleman
| KO (punches)
| UFC 31
| 
| align=center| 1
| align=center| 1:18
| Atlantic City, New Jersey, United States
| 
|-
| Win
| align=center| 6–1
| Jeff Monson
| Decision (unanimous)
| UFC 29
| 
| align=center| 3
| align=center| 5:00
| Tokyo, Japan
| 
|-
| Win
| align=center| 5–1
| Steve Heath
| KO (kick to the head)
| IFC WC 9
| 
| align=center| 2
| align=center| 5:39
| Friant, California, United States
| 
|-
| Win
| align=center| 4–1
| Paul Jones
| TKO (punches)
| UFC 22
| 
| align=center| 1
| align=center| 3:53
| Lake Charles, Louisiana, United States
| 
|-
| Win
| align=center| 3–1
| Kenneth Williams
| Submission (rear-naked choke)
| NG 11
| 
| align=center| 1
| align=center| 3:35
| Los Angeles, California, United States
| 
|-
| Loss
| align=center| 2–1
| Jeremy Horn
| Technical Submission (arm-triangle choke)
| UFC 19
| 
| align=center| 1
| align=center| 12:00
| Bay St. Louis, Mississippi, United States
| 
|-
| Win
| align=center| 2–0
| Jose Landi-Jons
| Decision (unanimous)
| IVC 6
| 
| align=center| 1
| align=center| 30:00
| Sao Paulo, Brazil
| 
|-
| Win
| align=center| 1–0
| Noe Hernandez
| Decision (unanimous)
| UFC 17
| 
| align=center| 1
| align=center| 12:00
| Mobile, Alabama, United States
| 

Pay-per-view bouts

Books
(2008) Iceman: My Fighting Life.'' Dutton Adult. .

References

External links

 

1969 births
Living people
American male mixed martial artists
American male sport wrestlers
Mixed martial artists from California
Middleweight mixed martial artists
Light heavyweight mixed martial artists
American male kickboxers
Kickboxers from California
Heavyweight kickboxers 
American male karateka
American kajukenbo practitioners
American practitioners of Brazilian jiu-jitsu
Mixed martial artists utilizing karate
Mixed martial artists utilizing American Kenpo
Mixed martial artists utilizing kajukenbo
Mixed martial artists utilizing collegiate wrestling
Mixed martial artists utilizing kickboxing
Mixed martial artists utilizing Brazilian jiu-jitsu
American people of Irish descent
Participants in American reality television series
Sportspeople from Santa Barbara, California
Ultimate Fighting Championship champions
Ultimate Fighting Championship male fighters